Doros is a genus of hoverflies. They are large slender flies, that mimic solitary wasp in slow flight. They have very limited flight period.

Species
Doros aequalis Loew, 1863
Doros destillatorius Mik, 1885
Doros profuges (Harris, 1780) (= Doros conopseus (Fabricius, 1775))
Doros rohdendorfi Smirnov, 1926

References

Hoverfly genera
Syrphinae
Syrphini
Taxa named by Johann Wilhelm Meigen